Lisa Vollmer (née Goßmann; 23 July 1937 – 29 November 2022) was a German social worker and politician. A member of the Social Democratic Party, she served in the Landtag of Hesse from 1985 to 1999.

Vollmer died on 29 November 2022 at the age of 85.

References

1937 births
2022 deaths
Politicians from Kassel
Social Democratic Party of Germany politicians
Members of the Landtag of Hesse